Coreura is a genus of moths in the subfamily Arctiinae. The genus was erected by Francis Walker in 1865.

Species
 Coreura albicosta Draudt, 1915
 Coreura alcedo Draudt, 1915
 Coreura cerealia Druce, 1897
 Coreura eion Druce, 1896
 Coreura engelkei Rothschild, 1912
 Coreura euchromioides Walker, 1864
 Coreura fida Hübner, 1827
 Coreura interposita Hampson, 1901
 Coreura lysimachides Druce, 1897
 Coreura phoenicides (Druce, 1884)
 Coreura simsoni Druce, 1885
 Coreura sinerubra Kaye, 1919

References

External links

Euchromiina
Moth genera